The Port of San Juan is a seaport facility located in the metropolitan area of San Juan, Puerto Rico.

The "Port of San Juan" is the general name used to call various passenger and cargo facilities located in lands around the San Juan Bay (Bahía de San Juan). The port is composed of a total of sixteen piers, of which eight are used for passenger ships and eight for cargo ships.  The port's facilities, in addition to, Luis Muñoz Marín International Airport and the Cataño Ferry "Lancha de Cataño" services, are property of the Puerto Rico Ports Authority.

The bay and its docks are located along San Antonio Canal, a narrow navigable section of San Juan Bay lying south of Old San Juan and San Juan island, and north and west of the Puerto Rico Convention Center District and Isla Grande Airport. The municipalities of Cataño, Guaynabo and San Juan compose the south side of the bay and port.

Cargo facilities

The Port of San Juan's cargo facilities are located on the southern portion of San Juan Bay. Of the approximately eight cargo terminals, five are located in the Puerto Nuevo district of San Juan and the other three are located in the neighboring municipality of Guaynabo. The cargo facilities allow for more than 500,000 square feet (46,000 m2) of space for loading and unloading cargo.

The location of the port's cargo facilities give it immediate access to Puerto Rico's vast expressway system and several major local routes, this allows for the fast and efficient transportation of goods throughout the Metropolitan Area and the rest of the island.

Passenger facilities
The Port of San Juan's passenger facilities are located along San Antonio Canal. Of the 15 piers in the channel, four accommodate cruise ships while others serve cargo vessels and the Cataño Ferry.

Ferry service

The Cataño Ferry (Lancha de Cataño) provides multiple daily round-trips from San Juan to Cataño. During the late 1980s, ferry service covered the San Juan area and the trip lasted approximately one hour. The service departed and arrived at the Old San Juan docks, but its popularity was short lived and thus this service was stopped during the early 1990s.

Cruise service 

While most cargo ships dock on the south side of the bay, cruise ships arrive at one of the four cruise piers located along San Antonio Canal. This arrangement allows tourists to walk to major attractions such as Old San Juan and the Puerto Rico Convention Center District. The short distance between the Luis Muñoz Marín International Airport and the cruise ship docks is 7 miles and makes the area a prime location for cruise companies.  Cruise ship companies, such as Carnival Cruises and Royal Caribbean prefer this setting, and have made the San Juan one of their ports of call. Some of the most recognized ships to have docked at the Port of San Juan during the late 1970s and early 1980s, were the Carla C, and Cunard's Countess and Princess ships.

Ships based out of San Juan 
The following cruise ships are homeported at San Juan:

Carnival Fascination
Freedom of the Seas
Celebrity Summit (seasonal)
Jewel of the Seas (seasonal)
Norwegian Dawn (seasonal)
Norwegian Epic (seasonal)
Silver Wind (seasonal) depart from San Juan to Fort Lauderdale
Vision of the Seas (seasonal)
Sea Dream II (seasonal)

Future ships based out of San Juan 
Disney Magic
Star Pride
Viking Sea

Operators that visit San Juan 
The following operators visit San Juan:
AIDA Cruises
Azamara Club Cruises
Carnival
Celebrity
Costa Crociere
Crystal Cruises
Disney Cruise Line
Holland America Line
MSC Cruises
Norwegian Cruise Line
Oceania Cruises
Princess Cruises
Regent Seven Seas Cruises
Royal Caribbean
SeaDream Yacht Club
Silversea
Viking Ocean Cruises
Windstar Cruises

Destinations
The following is a listing of the majority of the locations served by passenger ship and ferry routes.

Aruba
Antigua
Bahamas
Barbados
Bermuda
Bonaire
British Virgin Islands
Curaçao
Dominican Republic
Dominica
Grenada
Florida
Jamaica
Mexico
St. Kitts and Nevis
St. Lucia
St. Maarten
Trinidad and Tobago
Turks and Caicos
US Virgin Islands
Venezuela

Operations during Hurricane Maria 
After Hurricane Maria devastated the communications and electricity network in Puerto Rico on September 20, 2017, the Port could not get enough truck drivers to distribute containers of relief supplies. The landslides, floods, lack of gasoline, water and food, caused a "vast humanitarian and logistical challenge" and a FEMA rep said on October 3, "We are currently developing a strategy to reach the center of the island.”

See also

Transportation in Puerto Rico
 Port of Mayagüez
 Port of Ponce

References

External links

Puerto Rico Port Authority's page 
Estuario de la Bahia de San Juan
Norwegian Cruises to San Juan

Ports and harbors of Puerto Rico
Buildings and structures in San Juan, Puerto Rico